The East Midlands Air Support Unit was a joint consortium established to provide police aviation for Leicestershire Constabulary, Northamptonshire Police and Warwickshire Police. It was formed in April 1994 and operates a Eurocopter EC135 from Sulby, near Welford in Northamptonshire.

In October 2013, it was replaced by the National Police Air Service (NPAS).

Aircraft 
The unit began operations in 1994 using a Eurocopter AS355 Écureuil 2, G-EMAU.  This served until 1998 when it crashed shortly after takeoff from the base into woodland opposite, killing one member of crew and injuring two others.  A year later the unit received a new aircraft, G-EMAS, a Eurocopter EC135 T1.  This aircraft remained with the unit until 2007 when it was sold to the Royal Cayman Islands Police Service where it was re-registered VP-CPS.  The units final aircraft before its absorption into NPAS was G-EMID, an EC135 P2+ which transferred to NPAS.

See also
 Police aviation
 Police aviation in the United Kingdom

References

External links
Leicestershire Police: Where we've been
Northamptonshire Police: Police Helicopter Activity

Police aviation units of the United Kingdom
East Midlands
1994 establishments in England
Defunct organisations based in the United Kingdom
2013 disestablishments in England